Mixtape is a pre-debut extended play (EP) by South Korean boy group Stray Kids.  The EP was released digitally and physically on January 8, 2018 by JYP Entertainment and distributed through Genie Music. It consists of seven songs, all of which were performed on their epnoymous reality show. The album sold 45,249 physical copies in January.

Track listing
Credits adapted from Melon

Charts

Weekly charts

Year-end charts

Release history

Notes

References

2018 EPs
JYP Entertainment EPs
Genie Music EPs
Korean-language EPs
Stray Kids EPs